The Peltoceratinae comprise a subfamily in the Aspidoceratidae, (middle and upper Jurassic perisphinctacean ammonites).

Genera in the Peltoceratinae have sharply ribbed inner whorls and outer whorls that bear spines or tubercles, or have coarse simple ribs. Among these are giant forms with simple peristomes (aperture openings) that occur along with smaller forms with lappets.

Derivation of the Peltoceratinae seems most likely to be from the Pseudoperisphinctinae.

References
Arkell et al., 1957. Mesozoic Ammonoidea. Treatise on Invertebrate Paleontology, Part L (Ammonoidea). Geol Soc of America and Univ Kansas Press.

Jurassic ammonites
Aspidoceratidae